Sunil Khilnani is a professor of politics and history at Ashoka University, India. Previously, he was a professor of politics and the Director of the King's College London India Institute. He is a scholar of Indian history and politics best known as the author of The Idea of India (1997). He was the presenter of a BBC Radio 4 series entitled Incarnations: India in 50 Lives, which was later published as a book in 2016.
He was a 2010 Berlin Prize Fellow, and he was also a recipient of the Indian government's 2005 Pravasi Bharatiya Samman award.

Career
Khilnani was born in New Delhi and grew up on the continents of Africa, Europe and Asia. He earned a first at Trinity Hall, Cambridge, and a PhD at King's College, Cambridge.

He was Starr Foundation Professor at the Johns Hopkins University's School of Advanced International Studies, and Director of South Asia Studies. He has also served on the Humanities and Social Sciences juries for the Infosys Prize from 2013 to 2015. As of 2023, Khilnani is a Professor of Political Science and History at Ashoka University. He is also the Dean of AshokaX, an initiative by the university that allows those not affiliated with Ashoka to take courses specially tailored for them.

Personal life
He is married to the writer Katherine Boo.

Works

Books

Chapters in books

References

External links
Esmt.org
Thenation.com
Foreignaffairs.com

Living people
Academics from New Delhi
Academics of King's College London
Alumni of King's College, Cambridge
Alumni of Trinity Hall, Cambridge
Indian foreign policy writers
Johns Hopkins University faculty
Scholars of Indian foreign policy
Year of birth missing (living people)
Recipients of Pravasi Bharatiya Samman